Ismail Lleshi (born 2 October 1947) is an Albanian politician. He served as the Minister of Defence of Albania from 8 November 2000 to 12 September 2001. He was appointed Defence Minister following the promotion of Ilir Gjoni to the position of Interior Minister. He was a veteran of the Socialist Party of Albania at the time of his appointment, and was listed in the party leadership as far back as 1993. He was also a senior leader of the Labour Party, the predecessor to the Socialist Party. As Defence Minister, he frequently met with foreign military leaders.

References 

Year of birth uncertain
Living people
Government ministers of Albania
Defence ministers of Albania
1947 births